Makin' Out is an album by jazz pianist John Wright. The album was recorded in 1961 and released on the Prestige label.

Track listing 
All compositions by John Wright, except where indicated.
 "Makin' Out" (John Wright, Eddie Williams) – 4:54
 "Like Someone in Love" (Jimmy Van Heusen, Johnny Burke) – 4:31
 "Back in Jersey" (Wright, Williams) – 4:13
 "Sparkie" (Williams) – 4:37
 "*Soul Search" (Williams) – 4:33
 "It Could Happen to You" (Van Heusen, Burke) – 4:18
 "Street" – 3:14
 "Kitty" – 7:37

Personnel

Performers
John Wright – piano
Eddie "Cat-Eye" Williams – tenor saxophone
Wendell Marshall – bass
Roy Brooks – drums

Production
 Esmond Edwards – supervision
 Rudy Van Gelder – engineer

References 

1961 albums
John Wright (pianist) albums
Prestige Records albums
Albums recorded at Van Gelder Studio
Albums produced by Esmond Edwards